Chhangte Malsawmkima (born 10 September 1991) is an Indian footballer who plays as a midfielder for Fateh Hyderabad A.F.C. in the I-League 2nd Division.

Career

Mumbai
The 2011-12 football year got off to a good start for Malsawmkima as he made his debut for Mumbai F.C. in the 2011 Indian Federation Cup against Salgaocar. He then made his league debut for Mumbai against East Bengal on 2 November 2011.

Salgaocar
On 9 June 2012 it was confirmed that Malsawmkima signed for Salgaocar F.C. who also play in the I-League. However, on 8 December 2012 after not playing any games for Salgaocar in the I-League Malsawmkima was released from the club.

Mumbai (2nd term)
After being released from Salgaocar Malsawmkima re-signed with his former club Mumbai F.C. for which he made his second debut with the club on 24 January 2013 against Churchill Brothers S.C. in an I-League match at the Balewadi Sports Complex in which he played the full 90 as Mumbai drew the match 0–0.

Career statistics

Club
Statistics accurate as of 1 February 2013

References

Indian footballers
1991 births
Living people
I-League players
Mumbai FC players
Footballers from Mizoram
Salgaocar FC players
Association football midfielders
Mumbai Tigers FC players
Tollygunge Agragami FC players
Chanmari FC players
Fateh Hyderabad A.F.C. players
I-League 2nd Division players
Calcutta Football League players
Mizoram Premier League players